L. abyssinica can refer to a few different species.  The specific epithet  refers to Ethiopia, where many of these species may be found.

 Lachnocnema abyssinica, a butterfly
 Lagenaria abyssinica, a species of squash
 Lavatera abyssinica, a synonym for Malva aethiopica, a species of mallow in the genus Malva
 Lippia abyssinica, or koseret, a culinary herb